Sayler Park is a neighborhood in Cincinnati, Ohio. The population was 2,825 at the 2020 census.

The  Fernbank Park in Sayler Park stretches over a mile along the Ohio River. The Thornton Triangle is Cincinnati's smallest municipal park.

History
Sayler Park was originally known as Home City. Sayler Park was annexed by the City of Cincinnati in 1911. The neighborhood is known for its F5 tornado in 1974 during the Super Outbreak (one of seven F5 tornadoes during that outbreak) which killed three and demolished many homes.

Demographics

References

External links 
Sayler Park Community Council

Neighborhoods in Cincinnati